The Darker Side of Nonsense is the first full-length album by the American heavy metal band Dry Kill Logic. It was released on June 5, 2001, by Roadrunner Records and was the band's only release on that label.  The album spent two weeks on the Billboard Independent Albums chart, peaking at number 27.

Track listing

Personnel

Dry Kill Logic
Cliff Rigano - vocals
Scott Thompson - guitars
Dave Kowatch - bass guitar
Phil Arcuri - drums, additional guitars

Other
 Rob Caggiano – guitar, harmony vocals, mixing, engineer, percussion, noise, producer
 George Marino – mastering
 Eddie Wohl – keyboards, producer, mixing, engineer
 Steve Regina – producer, mixing, engineer
 Daniel Moss – photography
 The Collective - design
 Alexander Kneselac - illustration
 Bob Burns, Jr. – guitar
 J-Sin – vocals
 Dry Kill Logic – main performer
 J.P. Sheganoski – engineer
 Matt Myhal – harmony vocals

References

Dry Kill Logic albums
2001 debut albums
Roadrunner Records albums